Shalom Hills is a  group of four schools. (Class I - Class XII); Shalom Presidency School; Shalom Hills School (Nursery), Sushant Lok; and  Shalom Hills School (Nursery), Nirvana. All are co-education schools located in Gurgaon, India. The medium of instruction is in English and the curriculum followed is CBSE.

History 
The school was started in the year 2008 by Dr. Lilly George (managing director) at Sushant Lok, Gurgaon, and was further expanded to three more schools.

The Four Schools
 Shalom Hills International School located at Block-C, Sushant Lok Phase-I, Gurgaon - 122002

 Shalom Presidency School located at Golf Course Extension Road, Sector 56, Sushant Lok Phase-II, Gurgaon - 122011
Shalom Hills School (Nursery) Sushant Lok located at Block-E, Sushant Lok Phase-I, Gurgaon - 122002
Shalom Hills School (Nursery) Nirvana located near Gate No. 2, Unitech Nirvana, South City-II, Gurgaon - 122002

Sports, yoga and recreation

 The schools have infrastructure for various sports which include Cricket, Football, Skating, Basketball, Volleyball, Chess, Carrom, Table Tennis, Badminton and Karate.
 The schools also promote and provide facilities and faculty towards the training of yoga and meditation.
 The performing arts are also given importance, with dedicated faculty available for dance, music (instrumental and vocal), drama, sculpture, art and crafts and fine arts(painting).

School management

References

External links
 Shalom Hills International Schools - official website
 Shalom Presidency School
 CBSE Website

Primary schools in India
High schools and secondary schools in Haryana
International schools in India
Schools in Gurgaon
Educational institutions established in 2004
2004 establishments in India